Kaytee Boyd (born 8 February 1978) is a New Zealand track and road cyclist.

Life
Boyd was born in Hamilton, New Zealand in 1978. Her first sport was mountain biking. She was lured away from mountain biking to take up track cycling where she quickly gained gold medals.

Boyd also rode the team pursuit at the 2008–2009 UCI Track Cycling World Cup Classics with Alison Shanks and Lauren Ellis in Beijing, in a time of 3:28.044, becoming the fastest qualifiers. They went on to take the gold medal in a time of 3:24.421, setting the second fastest time in the world behind the 3:22.425 world record set by Great Britain at Manchester in 2008.
In 2009, she was in the Italian cycling team Selle Italia Ghezzi.

References

External links
 
 
 
 
 
 
 

1978 births
Living people
Sportspeople from Hamilton, New Zealand
New Zealand female cyclists
Cyclists at the 2010 Commonwealth Games
Commonwealth Games competitors for New Zealand